Fyodorovskoye is a rural locality (a selo) in Simskoye Rural Settlement, Yuryev-Polsky District, Vladimir Oblast, Russia. The population was 151 as of 2010.

Geography 
It is located on the Seleksha River, 5 km south from Sima, 16 km north from Yuryev-Polsky.

References 

Rural localities in Yuryev-Polsky District